St Helens Central railway station  (previously known as St. Helens Shaw Street) is a railway station serving the town of St Helens, Merseyside, England. It is on the Liverpool to Wigan Line from Liverpool Lime Street to Wigan North Western. The station and all trains calling at it are operated by TransPennine Express or Northern Trains.

The station is on the Merseytravel City Line. The City Line is the name given to local rail routes out of Liverpool Lime Street operated by companies other than Merseyrail. The City Line appears on Merseytravel network maps as red, and covers the Liverpool-Wigan Line.

History
The station was originally opened by the St Helens Canal and Railway as St Helens on 1 February 1858 to replace two earlier nearby 1833 and 1849 stations. It was renamed St Helens Shaw Street in 1949.

The station was completely rebuilt in 1961 to a design by the architect William Robert Headley which included and advertised a significant amount of the local Pilkington Vitrolite Glass. The fully glazed ticket hall was illuminated by a tower with a valley roof on two Y-shaped supports. The platform canopies were free standing folded plate roofs on tubular columns.

By this time, the original St Helens and Runcorn Gap Railway routes had both closed to passenger traffic, services having ceased on 18 June 1951. The short branch to St Helens Junction suffered the same fate in June 1965 as a result of the Beeching Axe, though freight traffic would continue to operate on both lines until the 1980s.

It then became St Helens Central in 1987 (the original GCR St Helens Central station situated on Corporation Street having been completely closed in 1952 and demolished in the late 1960s).  Two years later the through link to St Helens Junction was severed, though the section as far as the Hays Chemicals plant at Sutton Oak remained open until 2002 (the track remains in place but out of use to the present day).  This left only the Liverpool to Wigan line in operation, along with a short section of the old Rainford line serving the Pilkington Glass factory at Cowley Hill (near ) though this has also been disused for several years.

Leaving the station, the driving cab struck a bridge abutment; the driver was killed and 16 passengers received minor injuries.

In 2005, Merseytravel and Network Rail invited tenders for the reconstruction of the station, including a new station building, footbridge and lifts. The new station building and facilities were assembled just a few yards from the 1960s station building and is the third build on the same site. The project came in at a total estimated cost of £6 million, with the European Union contributing £1.7 million towards the total funding. The new footbridge was lifted into place in the early hours of 22 January 2007. Construction work was completed in the summer, with the new waiting rooms and footbridge opened to passengers on 19 September. The new station building was officially opened on 3 December 2007.

Electrification 
Overhead electrification of the Liverpool to Wigan line was completed in 2015. Earlier, modifications to the adjacent bridgeworks were undertaken in 2012 and during 2014 electrification masts and new signals were installed, overhead wiring taking place in early 2015. Northern Rail, the then train operating company, announced the introduction of electric services on the line from the commencement of the new timetable changeover in 2015.

Station information 
There is a booking office, with a ticket vending machine is provided next to it. Disabled access is facilitated by lifts on both platforms.

Car parking (including disabled bays) is available and is free for rail users, provided a parking ticket for the vehicle is obtained from the ticket office first. Re-charging facilities have recently been provided for electrically-powered vehicles.

Cold drink and snack vending machines are provided in the waiting room on the Wigan-bound platform. In March 2012, a dedicated coffee shop serving hot and cold food was opened upstairs in the main station building but closed in September 2012, the franchise remaining vacant up to the present.

As of 2017, St Helens Central operates automatic ticket barriers, replacing a temporary staffed barrier operated by Northern (Arriva Rail North).

Services 
During Monday to Saturday daytimes, there is a half-hourly local stopping service between Liverpool Lime Street and Wigan North Western, and an hourly fast service between Lime Street and  via . Until the May 2018 timetable update, this service started and terminated at Huyton or Liverpool South Parkway. Two TransPennine Express trains call per day from Liverpool Lime Street to Preston in both directions and one train per day is extended to Glasgow Central. On Sundays, this is extended to three trains per day in both directions.

On Sundays, there is now a half-hourly service to Wigan and Liverpool, with one of the former each hour continuing to Blackpool North.

The typical off-peak service is (Monday-Friday):

Northern 
 2 trains per hour to  via 
 2 trains per hour to Liverpool Lime Street

TransPennine Express 
 2 trains per day to Liverpool Lime Street
 1 trains per day to Preston 
 1 trains per day to Glasgow Central

See also 
 St Helens Junction railway station

References

External links 

 Disused Stations UK, for earlier St. Helens stations
 The station on an 1888-1913 Overlay OS Map via National Library of Scotland

Railway stations in St Helens, Merseyside
DfT Category D stations
Former London and North Western Railway stations
Railway stations in Great Britain opened in 1858
Northern franchise railway stations
William Robert Headley railway stations
Railway stations served by TransPennine Express